Sandy Creek is a stream in Audrain, Montgomery and Pike counties in the U.S. state of Missouri. It is a tributary of the Cuivre River.

Sandy Creek was named for the sandy character of its course.

See also
List of rivers of Missouri

References

Rivers of Audrain County, Missouri
Rivers of Montgomery County, Missouri
Rivers of Pike County, Missouri
Rivers of Missouri